In taxonomy, Methanotorris is a genus of the Methanocaldococcaceae. The organisms in this genus differ from those of Methanothermococcus in that they are hyperthermophiles and from those of Methanocaldococcus in that they have no flagella, are not motile, and do not require selenium to grow.  These microbes have not been shown to cause any illnesses.

Nomenclature
The name "Methanotorris" comes from the Latin methanum for methane and torris for fire.  Overall, it means "organism that produces methane at high temperatures."

See also
 List of Archaea genera

References

Further reading

Scientific journals

Scientific books

Scientific databases

External links

Archaea genera
Euryarchaeota